Sex aetates mundi may refer to 

 Six Ages of the World, a medieval theory of historiography
 The Reckoning of Time, work by Bede containing a chronicle called De sex aetatibus
 Sex aetates mundi (Irish), a medieval Irish chronicle